Bruna Reis Maia (born 4 August 1995), known professionally as Bruna Marquezine, is a Brazilian actress. She debuted on television in 2000 as one of the children interviewers for the children's program Gente Inocente. She has already been part of the cast of several telenovelas, including Mulheres Apaixonadas, América, Salve Jorge, I Love Paraisópolis and Deus Salve o Rei.

Throughout her career, Marquezine has been awarded the Troféu Imprensa, Contigo Award! 2004, Young Brazilian Award, among many others. 

She will play Penny, a love interest for Jaime Reyes (portrayed by Xolo Maridueña) in the upcoming DCEU film Blue Beetle.

Career

2000–11: Beginning of career and first works 

She began her television career in 2000 as one of the children interviewers for the children's program Gente Inocente. at the time, presented by Márcio Garcia. However, her first work as an actress had been in a commercial for the Military Police of São Paulo that talked about suicide and suicide prevention, when Bruna was still only five years old. This material reached Manoel Carlos and Ricardo Waddington, who later invited her to do a soap opera. Her debut in telenovelas came in 2003, in Mulheres Apaixonadas, by Manoel Carlos, where Bruna became nationally known for playing the character Salete. In the same year, she participated in the film Xuxa Abracadabra as the character Maria. 

In 2005, the young actress joined the cast of the telenovela América playing the visually impaired character Maria Flor. The author of the plot Gloria Perez, the actor Marcos Frota, who played the also disabled Jatobá, and Bruna Marquezine were honored with the Tiradentes Medal, in a session held in the plenary of the Legislative Assembly of Rio de Janeiro, at Tiradentes Palace. The highest award of the State was presented to the three for addressing the problems faced by the visually impaired in the telenovela América. The actress also acted in Cobras & Lagartos, in 2006, playing the character Lurdinha and Desejo Proibido, in 2007, playing Maria Augusta.

In 2008, she was promoted to the rank of teenage actress and gave life to her first protagonist, the martial arts fighter Flor de Lys in Negócio da China. In 2010, she participated in the telenovela Araguaia, as the orphan Terezinha. In 2011, she joined the cast of Quero Beijo, playing the co-protagonist Belezinha, a beauty queen.

2012–18: Adult and prominent characters 

In 2012, Marquezine played the character Lurdinha in the soap opera Salve Jorge. According to the actress, at the same time she considered giving up her career because of the objectification of her body. What helped her change her mind was the support network she found in other TV Globo actresses, such as Cássia Kiss and Vanessa Gerbeli. 

In 2014, she was invited by the author Manoel Carlos to play the traditional character Helena, in the second phase of the soap opera Em Família. In the third and main phase of the telenovela, she played Luiza, daughter of the protagonist Helena (now played by Júlia Lemmertz). In the same year, she is announced in the cast of I Love Paraisópolis, in which initially she was supposed to play an "attuned" resident of Paraisópolis, but later the direction of TV Globo, chose to change the role of Marquezine with that of Tatá Werneck, making Bruna the protagonist of the plot.

In 2016, she played the dancer and aspiring actress Beatriz dos Santos in the series Nada Será Como Antes, in which she starred in her first nude scenes on television. At the time, Marquezine called the character "the most challenging role of her career". In 2018, she was in the cast of the soap opera Deus Salve o Rei. A medieval-themed plot where the villain Catherine de Lurton lived for which the actress needed to lose five kilos for the composition of the character. Bruna's performance in this telenovela was criticized by the public, but despite this, she considered Catarina one of the most rewarding characters of her career. In September of the same year, Bruna was one of the highlights of the Dolce & Gabbana fashion show at Milan Fashion Week.

2019–present: Departure from Globo, fashion and other projects 

In 2019, she debuted as a protagonist in the cinema in Vou Nadar até Você, a film by Klaus Mitteldorf that was screened at the 47th Gramado Film Festival where she gave life to the character Ophelia. Taking a break from television, she became a regular attendee of fashion shows such as New York Fashion Week, Milan Fashion Week and Paris Fashion Week. Soon after, she became the poster girl for the Miu Miu, Puma e Karl Lagerfeld brands and for the jewelry company H. Stern.

In January 2020, she did not have her contract renewed with TV Globo after 17 years, since the station was adopting a new model of contracting by work, keeping only a few names in the fixed cast, most of them veterans. In addition, she recorded an appearance in the series Conquest, produced by Keanu Reeves for Netflix. In September, she presented MTV Miaw with her friend Manu Gavassi, and shortly after, she announced a YouTube channel to share the backstage of her projects.

On November 23, 2020, Marquezine was announced by Netflix as the streaming service's new hire. The following week, the company announced that the actress would play the character Liz in the series Maldivas alongside artists such as Manu Gavassi, Sheron Menezzes, Klebber Toledo, among others.

In November 2021, Bruna told in a interview that made auditions to play Supergirl in The Flash and ended in second place. The pandemic was one of the factors for the non-approval, since she couldn't travel to participate in the final stage. But on march 8, 2022 she was officially announce as Jenny in DC movie Blue Beetle, her first international role as an actress. Later, Marquezine declared that, despite not passing, the tests for Supergirl ended up being an open door to being on Warner's radar for new roles.

Personal life
Her birth name is Bruna Reis Maia, having adopted the surname Marquezine as a tribute to her grandmother. The artist was born in Duque de Caxias in the Baixada Fluminense, suburb of Rio de Janeiro. At the age of 13, she moved with her family, constituted by her father Telmo, a joiner, her mother Neide and little sister Luana, to Barra da Tijuca, Rio de Janeiro. In 2019, the actress bought a mansion, also in Barra da Tijuca.

In 2018, Marquezine revealed to have suffered from image disorders, depression and self-esteem problems in the past. The problems were fueled by online comments about her body. 

In February 2013, she publicly assumed her relationship with football player Neymar, together they maintained an on–off relationship for almost 5 years, but they ended definitively at the end of 2018. She had a brief relationship with model Marlon Teixeira between November 2014 and May 2015. Between, January 2021 and June 2021 she dated social entrepreneur Enzo Celulari.

Filmography

Music video

Theatre

Awards and nominations

References

External links
 
 
 

1995 births
Living people
People from Duque de Caxias, Rio de Janeiro
Brazilian child actresses
Brazilian telenovela actresses
Brazilian film actresses
Brazilian stage actresses
21st-century Brazilian actresses
Association footballers' wives and girlfriends
Brazilian feminists